Luca Ottolino (born 26 August 1978) is an Italian bobsledder. He competed in the four man event at the 2006 Winter Olympics.

References

External links
 

1978 births
Living people
Italian male bobsledders
Olympic bobsledders of Italy
Bobsledders at the 2006 Winter Olympics
Sportspeople from Bari